National Highway 548DD, commonly referred to as NH 548DD is a national highway in India. It is a secondary route of primary National Highway 48.  NH-548DD runs in the state of Maharashtra in India.

Route 
NH548DD connects Vadgaon, Katraj, Kondwa, Undri, (Mantarwadi Chowk), Vadki, Loni-Kalbhor, Theur phata, Kesanand and Lonikand in the state of Maharashtra.

Junctions  
 
  Terminal near Vadgaon.
  near Lonikand

See also 
 List of National Highways in India
 List of National Highways in India by state

References

External links 

 NH 548DD on OpenStreetMap

National highways in India
National Highways in Maharashtra